Heather Slade-Lipkin (9 March 1947 – 16 October 2017) was an English pianist, harpsichordist and teacher.

Biography

Slade-Lipkin was born into a musical family from Hoylake, Wirral. She began formal piano lessons before the age of six and made her concerto debut at the age of twelve. She studied with Gordon Green and Clifton Helliwell at the Royal Northern College of Music, and later in Paris with Kenneth Gilbert and Huguette Dreyfus.

Slade-Lipkin taught piano at the Royal Northern College of Music and the Royal Conservatoire of Scotland, and was a professor of piano at Chetham's School of Music. She won first prizes at the National Piano Competition and the National Harpsichord Competition, and was a finalist in the Paris International Fortepiano Competition. She appeared as a soloist with the City of Birmingham Symphony Orchestra and the BBC Symphony Orchestra. 

Notable students include:

 Stephen Hough
 Stephen Coombs
 Leon McCawley
 Sophie Yates
 Robert Markham
 Stephen Gosling
 Phillip Moore 
 Roderick Chadwick
 Jason Ridgway
 Jonathan Scott
 James Willshire
 Tim Horton
 Anna Markland
 Sarah Nicolls
 Joy-Helen Morin
 Nellie Seng
 Anna Michels
 Robert Emery 
 Miles Clery-Fox
 Jane Ford
 Eleanor Meynell
 James May
Recordings by Heather Slade-Lipkin include Jean-Philippe Rameau: The Second Book of Pièces de Clavecins and Contrasts with mezzo-soprano Marilena Zlatanou.

Slade-Lipkin died on 16 October 2017, aged 70, from metastatic pancreatic cancer.  She is interred at the Manchester Southern Cemetery.

References

1947 births
2017 deaths
British classical pianists
British women pianists
Academics of the Royal Northern College of Music
Alumni of the Royal Northern College of Music
British harpsichordists